Miss Universe is the debut album by English singer Nilüfer Yanya, released on 22 March 2019 on ATO Records.

Background and composition 
Miss Universe is Nilüfer Yanya's first full-length album. Yanya eschewed using any of her material from previous EPs, choosing instead to write an album using entirely new material, although some of the songs, such as "Monsters Under the Bed", had been written long beforehand.

The album is interspersed with interludes featuring messages from "WWAY Health", voiced by Yanya, which are short monologues in the form of automated phone messages that intimate at an alienating healthcare bureaucracy, with sparse ethereal sounds in the background.

Critical reception 

Miss Universe received wide critical acclaim on its release, with critics noting Yanya's ability to bounce back and forth between musical and lyrical styles, shifting between "gimlet-eyed composure and cataclysmic panic". The album was described as nervous and restless, combining influences from indie rock to soul, jazz, and trip hop. A Stereogum review called Yanya's voice "malleable and endlessly expressive", and described the song compositions as "minimal and instinctual". Pitchfork ranked the album as one of the best of 2019 in their year end review.

Track listing 

Notes
 Track 1 is stylised as "WWAY HEALTH™"
 Track 11 is stylised as ""Sparkle" GOD HELP ME"

Personnel 

Musicians
 Nilüfer Yanya – vocals, guitar , keyboards , piano 
 Adam Pickrell – keyboards 
 Wilma Archer – instrumentation , guitar , bass guitar , drums 
 John Congleton – drum and bass programming 
 Joey Waronker – drums 
 Jake Long – drums 
 Oli Barton-Wood – keyboards 
 Jazzi Bobbi – saxophone , backing vocals , keyboards , programming 
 Ellis Dupuy – drums 
 Bastian Laengbaek – piano 
 Dave Okumu – guitar , instrumentation , vocals 
 MT Hadley – instrumentation , programming 
 Hal Robinson – bass guitar 
 Lucy Lu – bass guitar 

Technical personnel
 Wilma Archer – recording 
 John Congleton – recording 
 Oli Barton-Wood – recording 
 Bastian Laengbaek – recording 
 Dave Okumu – recording 
 MT Hadley – recording 
 Jazzi Bobbi – recording 
 Lucy Lu – recording 
 Andy Ramsay – recording 
 Nathan Boddy – recording , mixing, additional production
 Matt Colton – mastering
 Molly Daniel – photography

Charts

References 

2019 debut albums
ATO Records albums
Nilüfer Yanya albums